is a Buddhist temple of the Sōtō Zen sect located in Nagoya, central Japan.

History 
Originally built in 1502 by Oda Nobuyuki in memory of his father, Oda Nobuhide, it was moved to its current location in 1714. The temple grounds have a turtle pond and a grove of giant bamboo. A 10-meter tall Buddha statue known as "The Great Buddha of Nagoya" was erected in 1987.

The closest subway is Motoyama Station on the Higashiyama Subway Line and Nagoya University.

References

External links 

Chikusa-ku, Nagoya
Buddhist temples in Nagoya